Helianthus mollis is a species of sunflower known by the common names ashy sunflower, hairy sunflower or downy sunflower. It is widespread across much of the United States and Canada, primarily the Great Lakes region from Ontario south to Texas and Alabama. Additional populations are found in the states of the Atlantic Coast from Maine to Georgia, but these appear to be introduced.

Helianthus mollis grows on prairies, roadsides, dry open woods, rocky glades, fields, and thickets. The leaves are mostly along the stem rather than crowded near the base, each egg-shaped with teeth along the edges. One plant produces 1-15 flower heads containing 17-22 yellow ray florets surrounding 75 or more yellow disc florets. Flowers bloom from July to September. The Latin specific epithet mollis means soft and is in reference to the downy plant hairs.

References

External links
Photo of herbarium specimen at Missouri Botanical Garden, collected in Missouri in 1986
Photo of herbarium specimen at Missouri Botanical Garden, collected in Missouri in 1993
Illinois Wildflowers
Ozark Edge Wildflowers
Lady Bird Johnson Wildflower Center, University of Texas
United States Department of Agriculture, National Forest Service

mollis
Flora of North America
Plants described in 1789